Sheeko is a glossy lifestyle magazine aimed at Horn Africans (Somalis, Ethiopians and Eritreans). The magazine is published quarterly in London. It covers current events, health, fashion, beauty, career and contemporary living, topics that are of interest to the Horn African community.

History
Sheeko was founded in 2006. It was conceived as a way to counter the negative stereotypes surrounding the people from these regions.

Mission
Sheeko endeavours to pull together Somalis, Eritreans and Ethiopians, or rather, the Horn of Africa collectively. The term Sheeko means "narrative" or "story" in the Somali language.

References

Nomad Radio Interview with Sheeko Magazine

External links
Sheeko Magazine Website

Lifestyle magazines published in the United Kingdom
Quarterly magazines published in the United Kingdom
Magazines published in London
Magazines established in 2006